Rao Asthan (died April 15, 1291) was the second Rao of Rathore clan. His father was Rao Sheoji and his mother was a Chavdi Rajputani.

History
He conquered Khed from Guhilotes and consequently his descendants bore the patronymic Khedecha Rathores.

Rao Asthan killed Samaliya Koli of Idar and granted Idar to his younger brother Sonag. Songa's descendants are thus known as Idariya Rathore.
Aja, Rao Asthan's another younger brother migrated near Dwarka, where he killed Bhojraj Chavda. Aja's descendants are known are Vadhels.

In 1291 A.D., Jalaludin Khilji alias Feroze Shah II attacked Pali. Rao Asthan reached Pali from Khed} and met the  Feroze Shah's army. He died fighting the Feroze Shah's forces on 15 April 1291.

Asthan had eight sons: Rao Doohad, Rao Jopsa, Rao Dhandhul, Rao Hirnak, Rao Pohad, Rao Khipsa, Rao Aasal and Rao Chachig.
Rao Dhandhul took over control of Kolu. His son was Pabu Ji Rathore.

See also
Rulers of Marwar

References

Maheca Rathaurom ka mula itihasa: Ravala Mallinatha ke vamsaja - Maheca, Baramera, Pokarana, Kotariya aura Khavariya Rathaurom ka sodhapurna itihasa by Dr. Hukam Singh Bhati. Publisher: Ratan Prakashan, Jodhpur (1990)''
 

1291 deaths
Military personnel killed in action
13th-century Indian people
Year of birth unknown